The Gotham-Attucks Music Publishing Company ("The House of Melody") was an African-American owned firm based in Manhattan, New York, that was formed July 15, 1905, by merger of the Gotham Music Company and the Attucks Music Publishing Company. The Gotham Music Company was founded by composer Will Marion Cook and songwriter Richard Cecil McPherson (aka Cecil Mack) and the Attucks Music Publishing Company, the first African-American music publishing company in the United States, founded in 1904 by Sheperd Nathaniel Edmonds (1874–1941). Gotham-Attucks ceased to operate as a legitimate music publisher after its sale to the "song shark" Ferdinand E. Miersch in 1911.

History 

"Attucks" was the surname of Crispus Attucks (1723–1770), an African American widely regarded as the first person killed in the Boston Massacre, which, by extension, makes him the first American killed in the American Revolution.

The Gotham-Attucks firm, according to Wayne D. Shirley in 1987, then a Music Specialist in the Music Division of the Library of Congress, was a small music publisher with relatively low output, but notable for the music it published. Despite never publishing more than twenty pieces a year over its eight-year existence, Gotham-Attucks managed to produce a remarkable number of important pieces. Its roster of composers and lyricists, according to Shirley, was impressive: Will Marion Cook, Bert Williams, Cecil Mack, Alex Rogers (né Alexander Claude Rogers; 1876–1930),  (1870–1924), Chris Smith, James Reese Europe, Tom Lemonier (1870–1945), James Tim Brymn, Henry Creamer, and Ford Dabney – all of whom influential in the history of popular music in the early years of the 20th century. Shirley asserted that, aside from an impressive roster of people, many of the works published by Gotham-Attucks during its short tenure are still important, especially "Nobody," Bert Williams's signature song, and "Shine," a song with an enduring legacy that, among other things, has been included by musicologist Richard Crawford in The Core Repertory of Jazz Standards on Record, 1900–1942.

Personnel 
Gotham-Attucks Music Company
 1907
 42 West 28th Street, Manhattan, New York
 Executives
 Alexander Rogers, President (né Alexander Claude Rogers; 1876–1930)
 Richard C. McPherson, Secretary
 (Capital $10,000)
 Directors
 Alexander Rogers
 Richard C. McPherson
  (1862–1924)
 George W. Walker
 Bert W. Williams
 Jesse A. Shipp

Extant music

Attucks Music Publishing Company

Gotham Music Publishing Company

Gotham-Attucks Music Company 

 
 
 
 
 

 Form Abyssinia (1906)
 
 
 
 
 
 
 

 Gotham-Attucks (continued)
 
 
 
 
 
 
 

 From Bandanna Land
 
 
 
 
 
 
 
 
 
 
 
 

 Gotham-Attucks (continued)
 "Be My Little Dinah True" (1908)
 
 
 
 
 
 
 
 
 
 
 
 
 
 
 
 

 From His Honor the Barber
 
 

 Gotham-Attucks (continued)

Notes and references

Notes

References

External links 
 

Music publishing companies of the United States
Companies based in New York City
Publishing companies established in 1904
1904 establishments in New York City
Sheet music publishing companies